The Parabel is a river in the Tomsk Oblast in Russia. It is a left tributary of the Ob. The river is formed at the confluence of the rivers Kyonga and Chuzik. The Parabel freezes in the second half of October to early November and stays under the ice until late April to early May.

References

Rivers of Tomsk Oblast